İbrahimhacılı (also, Ibrogim-Gadzhyly, Ibragim-Gadzhaly, and Ibragim Gadzhyly) is a village and municipality in the Tovuz Rayon of Azerbaijan.  It has a population of 3,838.

References 

Populated places in Tovuz District